The Rich Landowner and the Farmhand is a 1953 Soviet film directed by Latif Faiziyev and Aleksandr Gintsburg.

Cast
 Yayra Abdullaeva  
 Gani Agzamov  as Domla Imam  
 Shukur Burkhanov  
 Abid Dshalilov  as Salikhbay  
 Sora Eshontoraeva  as Dzhamilya 
 Malik Kayumov as Gafur's friend  
 Sharif Kayumov 
 Zamira Khidoyatova  as Rakhimakhola  
 Kudrat Khodzhaev  as Head of the uyezd  
 Lutfulla Nazrullaev  as Holmat  
 Nabi Rakhimov  as Aleksey  
 Zainab Sadriyeva  as Poshissim  
 Sagdi Tabibullayev  as Ellig-bashi  
 Dzhura Tadzhiyev  
 Amin Turdiyev  as Kadurkul-Mingbashi  
 Maryam Yakubova  as Khondoza

References

Bibliography 
 Prominent Personalities in the USSR. Scarecrow Press, 1968.

External links 
 

1953 films
Soviet drama films
1950s Russian-language films